"Faithfulness" is a song by Skunk Anansie frontwoman Skin, released in September 2003 as the second single from her debut solo album Fleshwounds. It reached No. 17 in Italy and in Spain, No. 64 on the UK Singles Chart and No. 99 in the Netherlands.

Track listing

UK CD single
 "Faithfulness" (Radio Mix)
 "Faithfulness" (Scumfrog Mix)

UK DVD single
 "Faithfulness" (Video)
 "Faithfulness" (Kinky Boy Rock Goth Mix - Audio)
 "Faithfulness" (Moonbootica Mix - Audio)

References

2003 songs
2003 singles
Music videos directed by Tim Royes
Skin (musician) songs
Songs written by Skin (musician)
Songs written by Len Arran
EMI Records singles